The Court Square Historic District in Leitchfield, Kentucky was listed on the National Register of Historic Places in 1984.

The listing was expanded in 1988 to add two more contributing buildings and two contributing objects.

The increase included the Daniel O'Riley House, at 104 N. Main St., and the Dr. Green House, at 106 N. Main.  Dr. Joseph Theodore Green was a local physician.  The Dr. Green House is a two-story T-plan house with decorative shingles and three gables having bargeboard trim, plus a one-story three-sided bay in the main facade.

The increase also revised the status of two buildings, designating the former Grayson County Courthouse (1935) as a contributing building as 50 years of age had passed, and similarly designating the Alice Theater and Alexander Hotel building (1935), known also as the Nichols Building.

The courthouse, which in 1987 held various government and community offices, is a "three-story-plus-attic cubical mass extended on the north and south by large but slightly shorter wings."  It has a monumental stone portico with Corinthian pilasters, topped by a brick parapet and a round clock.

The district includes the Old Grayson County Jail (1934), 113 E. Main St., "an example of WPA Public Architecture. Classical in design elements (palladian window and pilasters) it has unusual and decorative brick and stone patterns on the front facade."

References

Historic districts on the National Register of Historic Places in Kentucky
National Register of Historic Places in Grayson County, Kentucky
Victorian architecture in Kentucky
Squares in the United States
Leitchfield, Kentucky